James Channon Roe  (born October 27, 1969) is an American former actor. He began his film and television career in the mid-1990s. He first appeared on TV series My So-Called Life as Logan in 1994. Roe began his acting career in independent films, including The Low Life and Junked.

Early life
Roe was born in Pasadena, California, but raised in Corona del Mar before training as an actor at the Joanne Baron / D.W. Brown Acting Studio and then at the British Academy of Dramatic Arts.

Career
Roe began his film and television career in the mid-1990s. He first appeared on TV series My So-Called Life as Billy in 1994 and his acting career in independent films including "The Low Life" and "Junked".

In 1996, Roe starred as the lead character "Cash", Primogen (leader) of the Gangrel Clan of vampires, in the cult television series Kindred: The Embraced. Bio-Dome and Soldier Boys soon followed in Person's Unknown, alongside Naomi Watts, Kelly Lynch, Joe Mantegna and directed by George Hickenlooper, and Academy Award-nominated Boogie Nights.

Channon Roe has appeared in over 35 television series to date, including recurring performances such as Dirt starring Courteney Cox as Jeff Stagliano, the Indie Director who impregnates a very disturbed Shannyn Sossamon, and Windfall as Jeremy. Roe has also appeared on The OC, 24, Prison Break, Bones, CSI: Miami, CSI: Crime Scene Investigation, The X-Files, Buffy the Vampire Slayer, Charmed, Going to California, Without a Trace, NYPD Blue, Diagnosis Murder, Touched by an Angel, The Pretender, Fugitive, Spawn and HeadCase.

In 2008, Roe completed filming on two new projects, a pilot for A&E Television alongside Henry Thomas and Behind Enemy Lines: Columbia.

Roe appeared as Riley Maker on the TNT crime drama series Murder in the First in 2015, then Roe retired from his acting career.

Personal life 
Roe is an avid surfer, and is highly involved with activist groups Green Peace, Heal the Bay, and Surfrider Foundation. Roe has been a vegetarian for over 20 years and drives a Mercedes 1983 Vegetable Oil Conversion by Love Craft he married Australian actress  Bianca Chiminello in 2009.

Filmography

Film

Television

External links
 

1969 births
American male film actors
Living people
People from Pasadena, California
People from Newport Beach, California